Fuerteventura is one of the Canary Islands, in the Atlantic Ocean, part of the North Africa region, and politically part of Spain. The island was declared a biosphere reserve by UNESCO in 2009.

Fuerteventura belongs to Province of Las Palmas, one of the two provinces that form the autonomous community of the Canary Islands. The island's capital is Puerto del Rosario, where the Insule Council is found, the government of the island. Fuerteventura has 119,732 inhabitants, the fourth largest population of the Canary Islands and the third of the province. At , it is the second largest of the Canary Islands, after Tenerife. From a geological point of view, Fuerteventura is the oldest island in the archipelago.

Toponymy
The island's name is a compound word formed by the Spanish words for "strong" (fuerte) and "fortune" (ventura). Traditionally, Fuerteventura's name has been regarded as a reference to the strong winds around the island and the resulting danger to nautical adventurers. However, it might have referred instead (or also) to wealth, luck or destiny.

In 1339 the Mallorcan navigator Angelino Dulcert, in the Planisferio de Angelino Dulcert, referred to the island as "Forte Ventura".

Another theory is that the island's name derives from "Fortunatae Insulae" (Fortunate Islands), the name by which the Romans knew the Canary Islands.

The indigenous name of the island, before its conquest in the 15th century, was Erbania, divided into two regions (Jandía and Maxorata), from which the name majorero (originally majo or maxo) derives. However, it has been suggested that, at some point, Maxorata (which meant "the children of the country") was the aboriginal toponym of the entire island.

History

Precolonial history 

The first settlers of Fuerteventura are believed to have come from North Africa. The word Mahorero (Majorero) or Maho is still used today to describe the people of Fuerteventura and is derived from the ancient word 'mahos', a type of goatskin shoe worn by these original inhabitants. They lived in caves and semi-subterranean dwellings, some of which have been excavated, revealing remnants of early tools and pottery. In antiquity, the island was originally known as Planaria, in reference to the flatness of most of its terrain.

Phoenician settlers landed in Fuerteventura and Lanzarote.

Several Spanish and Portuguese expeditions to the islands were organized around 1340, followed by Moors and European slave traders. At the end of the Iberian conquest, the island was divided into two Guanches kingdoms, one adhering to King Guize and the other to King Ayoze. The territories of these kingdoms were called Maxorata (in the North) and Jandía (in the South) respectively. They were separated by a wall, which traversed the La Pared isthmus. Some remains have been preserved. The ancient name for the island, Erbania, is derived from this wall's name.

The conquest 
The island's conquest began in earnest in 1402, commanded by French knights and crusaders Jean de Béthencourt and Gadifer de la Salle. They arrived with only 63 sailors out of the original 283, as many had deserted along the way. After arriving and settling in Lanzarote, the invaders made some first excursions to the neighboring islands. In 1404, Bethencourt and Gadifer founded Betancuria, on the West coast, the first settlement on the island. After numerous difficulties, Gadifer took charge of the invasion, while Bethencourt returned to Spain to seek the recognition and support of the Castilian king.

In 1405, de Béthencourt completed his conquest of the island, establishing its capital in Betancuria (Puerto Rosario took over the mantle as island capital in 1835).

In 1424 Pope Martin V, through the Betancuria Brief, edicted the establishment of the Bishopric of Fuerteventura, which encompassed all the Canary Islands save for the island of Lanzarote. The origin of this bishopric is directly related to the events that occurred after the Great Schism (1378–1417), in that the bishop of San Marcial del Rubicón of Lanzarote (at the time, the only diocese in the Canary Islands) did not recognize the papacy of Martin V, and instead adhered to anti-Pope Benedict XIII. The Bishopric of Fuerteventura was based in the Parish of Santa María de Betancuria, bestowing upon the latter the status of Grant Cathedral. After the reabsorbtion of the Diocese of San Marcial del Rubicón by the papacy of Pope Martin V, the Bishopric of Fuerteventura was abolished in 1431, only seven years after it was created.

The first census recorded a population of some 1,200 inhabitants. The population increased gradually thereafter. In 1476 the territory became the Señorío Territorial de Fuerteventura, subjected to the Catholic Monarchs. In later years, the island was invaded by the Spanish, French and the English.

2nd conquest of Fuerteventura 
Over time, the island endured numerous raids. A Berber-led expedition invaded in 1593, sweeping as far inland as the capital. Various castles were built along the coastline, to protect against these type of attacks. The population was moved inland as a second protective measure. Because of the raids, a first Captain General was dispatched to Fuerteventura, accompanied by a number of Sergeant Majors, to defend the island in the name of the Crown. At that time Betancuria became the religious capital of the island.

Two major attacks took place in 1740, within a month of each other. Two separate bands of English privateers attempted to loot the town of Tuineje. These attacks were however successfully averted by the local population and the island's militia. This successful repelling of the invaders is celebrated at a re-enactment that takes place in Gran Tarajal every year in October.

The island's garrison was officially instated in 1708. Its colonel assumed the title of Governor at Arms, a hereditary, lifelong appointment which has remained in the Sánchez-Dumpiérrez family. In time, this family increasingly garnered power over the other islands through alliances with the family of Arias de Saavedra and the Lady of Fuerteventura. During the same year the Assistant Parish of La Oliva and Pájara was created, to become operational in 1711. On 17 December 1790 the Assistant Parish of Tuineje was created, which became a new parish division on 23 June 1792 under the bishop Tavira, with lands including part of the Jandía peninsular, and with a population of 1,670 inhabitants. 1780 saw the start of a barrilla plantation industry.

To the present
In 1852, a free trade zone was extended by Isabella II to the Canary Islands. Military island rule, which began in 1708, was finally dissolved in 1859, and Puerto de Cabras (now Puerto del Rosario) became the new capital.

The Canary Islands obtained self-governance in 1912. In 1927, Fuerteventura and Lanzarote became part of the province of Gran Canaria. The seat of the island's government (cabildo insular) is located in Puerto del Rosario. A total of 118,574 people lived on the island in 2018.

By the 1940s the island had an airport (just west of Puerto del Rosario on the road to Tindaya, still visible today). Mass tourism began to arrive in the mid-1960s, facilitated by the construction of Fuerteventura Airport at El Matorral and the first tourist hotels.

The island's proximity (a mere 100 km) to the West African coast and the fact that it is part of the Schengen territory make it a prime target destination for undocumented immigrants. However, many have perished while attempting the crossing.

Flag

The flag of Fuerteventura is in proportions 1:2, divided vertically, green to the hoist and white to the fly end, with the coat of arms of the island in the centre.

Coat of arms
The coat of arms of Fuerteventura was prescribed by a Decree adopted on 15 October 1998 by the Government of the Canary Islands and published on 11 November 1998 in the official gazette of the Canary Islands, No. 142, pp. 13,432–13,433. It was adopted on 24 April 1998 by the Island Council and validated on 18 September 1998 by the Heraldry Commission of the Canary Islands.

The heraldic description is "per pale and per fess. First, gules, a castle or, masoned sable, its gate and windows azure. 
Second, argent, lion gules, crowned, armed and langued or. Third, silver, three fesses chequy gules and or, in four rows, each one charged with a fess or. 
Bordure gules, with eight saltires or. Ensigned with a royal crown, open."

According to José Manuel Erbez (Banderas y escudos de Canarias, 2007), the coat of arms is based on the arms of the island's provincial militia. 
The upper quarters represent Castile (symbolized by a castle) and León (symbolized by a lion). The lower quarter alludes to the Saavedra family; various members of this family were lords of Fuerteventura.

Geography

Environment

It is part of the Province of Las Palmas. It is divided into six municipalities:
Antigua
Betancuria
La Oliva
Pájara
Puerto del Rosario
Tuineje
100 individual settlements are distributed through these municipalities. A nearby islet, Islote de Lobos, is part of the municipality of La Oliva.

The island is a destination for sun, beach and watersports enthusiasts. It lies at the same latitude as Florida and Mexico and temperatures rarely fall below  or rise above .

The highest point in Fuerteventura is Pico de la Zarza (807 m) in the southwestern part of the island. The island is divided into two parts, the northern portion which is Maxorata and the southwestern part called the Jandía peninsula.

Climate
The climate on Fuerteventura is mild, but mostly windy, throughout the year. The island is hence referred to as the island of eternal spring. The sea regulates air temperature, diverting hot Sahara winds away from the island. The island's name in English translates as "strong fortune" or "strong wind", the Spanish word for wind being viento. December is the month with highest rainfall.

A sandstorm known as the Calima (similar to the Sirocco wind, which blows to the North of the Sahara, to Europe) may blow from the Sahara Desert to the Northwest, and can cause high temperatures, low visibility and drying air. Temperatures during this phenomenon rise temporarily by approximately 10 degrees Celsius.

Hydrology
In the winter months, up to 80% of the rainwater flows unused into the ocean, as there is no vegetation to capture the water (also due to overgrazing by free-ranging goats near the coast).
The mountain forests, which were still present in the 19th century, were all chopped down. 
Instead, there are many desalination plants (running on electricity) which produce the required amount of freshwater on the island. The tourists on the island use about double the amount of water as the native inhabitants of Fuerteventura. Causes are the filling of swimming pools, watering hotel gardens and washing towels, ...

Geology
Fuerteventura is the oldest island in the Canary Islands dating back 20 million years to a volcanic eruption from the Canary hotspot. The majority of the island was created about 5 million years ago and since then has been eroded by wind and precipitation. The last volcanic activity in Fuerteventura occurred between 4,000 and 5,000 years ago.

Beaches

Fuerteventura was chosen among 500 European destinations by the Quality Coast International Certification Program of the European Coastal and Marine Union as one of the most attractive tourist destinations for visitors interested in cultural heritage, environment and sustainability. The best beaches to visit are Playa de Cofete, Playas de Jandia, Playas de Corralejo, Playa de Ajuy, and Playas de El Cotillo.

Wildlife

The island is home to one of the two surviving populations of the threatened Canarian Egyptian vulture. It is also inhabited by many wild dogs and cats. On the barren, rocky land there are Barbary ground squirrels and geckos. Fuerteventura also hosts several migratory and nesting birds. The island has significant populations of the collared dove, common swifts and several finch species especially in the vicinity of holiday developments.

Despite its arid climate, the island is also home to a surprisingly large insect fauna. Butterflies which commonly occur on the island include the clouded yellow (Colias hyale) and the bath white (Pontia daplidice) which feeds on xerophytic cruciferae. The island is also home to the monarch butterfly (Danaus plexippus) and its close African relative Danaus chrysippus. Around holiday developments such as Caleta de Fuste, water is relatively abundant, and dragonfly species including the blue emperor (Anax imperator) and the scarlet darter (Crocothemis erythraea) can be found. The island's sand dunes and shoreline are home to a number of bee and wasp species including the large eumenid caterpillar hunting wasp, Delta dimidiatipenne and the blue banded bee (Amegilla canifrons).

Hawkmoths also occur on the island. One of the more notable species is Hyles tithymali which feeds on endemic spurges such as Euphorbia regis-jubae. Acherontia atropos, the deaths-head hawkmoth also occurs on the island presumably feeding on members of the Solanaceae, for example, Datura innoxia and Nicotiana glauca which are common weeds in the vicinity of human habitation.

Natural symbols 

The official natural symbols associated with Fuerteventura are Chlamydotis undulata fuertaventurae (hubara or houbara) and Euphorbia handiensis (Cardón de Jandía).

Demographics

Population 
The island has a population of 116,886. Throughout its long history, Fuerteventura has suffered from a population decline due to the economic situation and the climate, which have made it into a desert island. However, the development of tourism during the 1980s has caused the population to grow year on year since then, doubling it in a little less than a decade.

In 2005, with 86,642 registered inhabitants, the Fuerteventura population was formed by the following:
Born on the island: 30,364
Born on another Canary Island: 13,175
Born elsewhere in Spain: 20,938
Born in other countries: 22,165

Comparing this data with the 2001 census shows that the number of permanent residents born on the island has increased by just 3,000. The number who have moved in from abroad has increased by 22,910, making this the biggest contributor to population growth in recent years.

Education 
The island has 116 schools, with a total of 14,337 pupils. Of these, 45 are primary schools, ten are secondary schools, six are for Baccalaureate students and four are vocational colleges.

Fuerteventura also has a centre linked with the National University of Distance Education, offering courses in many subjects including economics, business studies, law, history and tourism.

State administration 
Fuerteventura is governed by the Island Department of the Government of Spain, which holds the rank of a Government Subdepartment. The government building is located in the centre of the capital city.

This institution is charged with representing the Government of Spain on the island, and managing all the functions that are not under control of the Canarian Government. This includes the following public services:
Island Security Forces (National Police and Guardia Civil)
Puerto del Rosario port and Fuerteventura Airport
Tax Agency
Customs
the Maritime and Coastguard department
Driving licences, Traffic and Highways
Immigration – the Immigration Detention Centre and residential permits
Social Security
Red Cross
Seprona (the Nature Protection Service)
Passports

Since 30 June 2007, the island's governor has been Eustaquio Juan Santana Gil. 4

Island Council of Fuerteventura (Cabildo)
The councils, formed as part of the Councils Act of 1912, administer the Canary Islands and have two principal functions. On one hand, they perform services for the Autonomous Community, and on the other, they are the local government centre for the island. In the 2003 elections, Mario Cabrera González was elected as president representing the Canarian Coalition, with 31.02% of the votes, followed by the Spanish Socialist Workers' Party with 27.53%, represented by the Vice President Domingo Fuentes Curbelo.

Municipalities 

The island is divided into six municipalities with their respective city councils which form part of the FECAM (Federation of Canarian Municipalities). They are governed by the basic legislation of the local regime and their respective organic rules. The populations of the municipalities are as follows:

In turn, these municipalities are organised into two associations: the Mancomunidad de Municipios del Centro-Norte de Fuerteventura formed from La Oliva and Puerto del Rosario, and the remaining municipalities make up the Mancomunidad de Municipios del Centro-Sur de Fuerteventura.

Economy

Both Fuerteventura and Lanzarote would be the main exporters of wheat and cereals to the central islands of the archipelago during the 16th, 17th and 18th centuries; Tenerife and Gran Canaria. Although, this trade almost never reverted to the inhabitants of Lanzarote and Fuerteventura (because the landowners of these islands profited from this activity), producing periods of famine, so some of the population of these islands had to move to Tenerife and Gran Canaria to try to improve their luck. Therefore, the island of Tenerife constituted as the main focus of attraction for majoreros and lanzaroteños, hence the feeling of union that has always existed amongst these islands.

The economy of Fuerteventura is mainly based on tourism. Primary tourist areas are located around the existing towns of Corralejo in the north and Morro Jable in Jandia, plus the purely tourist development of Caleta de Fuste, south of Puerto del Rosario. Other main industries are fishing and agriculture (cereals and vegetables). The famous Majorero cheese is locally made from the milk of the indigenous majorera goat.

In 2009, Fuerteventura recorded the highest EU regional unemployment rate at a NUTS3 level, at 29.2 percent.

Tourism
The first tourist hotel was built in 1965 followed by the construction of Fuerteventura Airport at El Matorral, heralding the dawn of a new era for the island. Fuerteventura, with its 3,000 sunshine hours a year, was placed firmly on the world stage as a major European holiday destination.
While having fully developed tourist facilities, the island has not experienced the overdevelopment found on some other islands. Nonetheless, it remains a destination for predominantly but not exclusively European tourists.

The summer Trade Winds and winter swells of the Atlantic make this a year-round surfers' paradise, with more exposed areas on the north and west shores such as Corralejo and El Cotillo proving most popular. Wind surfing takes places at locations around the island. Sailors, scuba divers and big-game fishermen are all drawn to these clear blue Atlantic waters where whales, dolphins, marlin and turtles are all common sights. With many hills present throughout the Island, hikers are also attracted to this Island.

Excellent sandy beaches are found in many locations. Western beaches, such as those around El Cotillo, can experience strong surf. The beaches adjoining the extensive sand dunes east of Corralejo are popular, as are the more protected extensive sandy shores of the Playa de Sotavento de Jandia on the southeastern coast between Costa Calma and the Morro Jable. Naked sun bathing and swimming are the norm almost on all beaches.

Much of the interior, with its large plains, lavascapes and volcanic mountains, consists of protected areas, although there are organised tours and vehicular access across them.

Art and culture

Traditional holidays 

Like the rest of the Canaries, Carnival is traditionally one of the biggest festivals celebrated on the island. It is celebrated in different ways in all the towns during February and March. These festivities have a different theme each year. They include activities such as parades and galas to choose the carnival king.

Concerts and festivals 

There are many concerts and festivals held in the auditoriums, such as the Festival of Canarian Music. They are also held in smaller venues across the island, featuring bands such as Estopa, Van Gogh's Ear, and King Afrhica.

Lebrancho Rock: in 2004, the Town Hall of Puerto del Rosario started this initiative for the growing number of local bands who had been performing in the area for years but had not had the chance to play at the same event.
Fuertemusica: like Lebrancho Rock, this festival aims to encourage the local or emerging groups. It started in the same year. This festival is mainly for groups that are already known in the music world. It takes place in El Cotillo.
In the municipality of Betancuria (more specifically in the village of Vega de Rio Palmas) held every year the festivities in honor of the Virgen de la Peña, patron saint of the island of Fuerteventura, the most representative is the pilgrimage in which are involved people from all corners of the island. The holiday is celebrated on the third Saturday of September.

Festival Internacional de Cometas/International Kite Festival is held on the second week of November each year centering on the Corralejo Beaches. It attracts kitefliers and kite surfers from all over Europe. It is popular because the winds are warm and constant and the beaches become filled with hundreds of colourful kites of all shapes and sizes.

Auditoriums 

Fuerteventura has three auditoriums. These are used for all types of performing art. They are also used for non-artistic purposes, such as conferences, charity galas and political meetings.

The Isle of Fuerteventura Auditorium
Gran Tarajal Auditorium
Corralejo Auditorium

Central library 
The Central Library of the Island is located in Antigua's city centre, in the public university. In addition to providing the traditional library services, it has a 180-seat multipurpose room, air conditioning, a wifi zone, and a multimedia room used for seminars, presentations, film festivals etc.

Museums and exhibition spaces 

The island has several museums with different themes and plenty of exhibition spaces, both public and private. These include:

The Antigua Windmill Craft Centre
The Salt Museum
The Atalayita Archeological Interpretation Centre

Sculpture park 
In addition to the museums, the capital Puerto del Rosario has an open-air sculpture park consisting of around 100 sculptures by different artists scattered across the city. Most of them were created for the International Symposium of Sculpture celebrated annually since 2001. During the festival, artists come from all over the world to erect their sculptures in the open air, in full view of passers by.

Main sights
Sites of interest include Corralejo and El Jable to the north which are made up of fine sand dunes whilst the south is filled with long beaches and remote bays. The constant winds blowing onto the beaches provide a paradise for windsurfing. Surfing is common on the west and north coasts where there are large waves. Windsurfing is common around Corralejo and Playas de Sotavento and wave sailing (windsurfing on the waves) on the coast along the northern half of the island. El Cotillo is a small fishing village in the north-west of the Island famous for a very long beach to the south of the village and few very calm beaches to the north. The northern beaches frequented by snorkeling enthusiasts and sun worshippers alike are referred to as lakes by the locals. 

At Cofete on the western side of Jandía a remote and imposing house – Villa Winter – looks out to sea across wide beaches. It was reputedly built by a Mr Winter on land given by Generalisimo Franco.

For a time, the beaches were home to a popular accidental attraction. On 18 January 1994 the United States Lines ocean liner SS American Star (former America, USS West Point, Australis) was beached in Playa de Garcey during a severe storm. Within a year, she broke in two and later lost her stern. By 2007 the rest of the severely deteriorated ship had collapsed onto her port side, gradually keeling over further and almost completely submerged. By 2008–2012, most of the remains finally slipped below the surface.

Food 

The cuisine is fairly basic due to the customs and climate conditions. They share this simplicity with the other Canary islands, and similarly to them, they use a large quantity of fish. They also use whatever they can grow in the near-barren land. This includes papas arrugadas, a dish of wrinkled potatoes usually served with mojo, which is a hot pepper sauce or with puchero canario, a meat stew.

Seafood is prepared in many ways traditionally, such as pejines (salted fish), jareas, or sancocho (a type of stew) made from fish, generally the grouper, corvina or sama, boiled after salting, and served with mojo, potatoes, or gofio (a type of grain). People are also very keen on the mussels and limpets collected on the island's coasts.

They also use meat such as beef and pork to make different dishes or simply to for braising, but their main meat is goat, both from the kids and from the older animals. They eat the goat roasted or stewed. Goats are not only useful for their meat – the Fuerteventurans also use the milk to make the cheese majorero, which has won many prizes. The majorero is mostly made of goats milk, and occasionally it is up to 15% ewes milk. It is cured in pimento oil or gofio meal. Majorero and palmero cheese are the only two Canarian cheeses with protected denomination of origin.

Transport and communications 

The main methods of arriving and departing the islands are by flying and by ferry.

Airports 

The airport is the main access point to the island. The airport has flight connections to over 80 destinations worldwide, and over 5.6 million passengers passed through it in 2016. In 1994, the new airport terminal was constructed. In December 2009, the new facilities of the arrivals terminal of Fuerteventura Airport were inaugurated, tripling the space available in the old facilities. Up to 4000 passengers per hour can be served concurrently thanks to the new facilities.

Notably, Binter Canarias serves the airport as the regional airline connecting passengers across Canary Islands.

Ports 

Maritime communications are made from four ports: Puerto del Rosario, Corralejo, Gran Tarajal and Morro Jable. Cargo operations are the main activity of the island's main port in Puerto del Rosario, although its facilities allow the docking of tourist cruises including a ferry from Gran Canaria. Passenger traffic is mainly channeled through Corralejo, Gran Tarajal and Morro Jable. The port of Corralejo connects the island with Lanzarote. The port of Gran Tarajal connects the island with Gran Canaria and Morro Jable connects the island with Gran Canaria and Tenerife.

Roads 

There are two highways on the island: FV-1 and FV-2. The FV-1, together with the FV-2, is part of the major construction project of the north–south motorway on Fuerteventura.

The FV-1 begins in the north, in the town of Corralejo and ends in the island's capital Puerto del Rosario. FV-1 is part dual carriageway and part single carriageway. In the past, the FV-1 also ran through the Corralejo Dune Nature Reserve. In order to direct through traffic out of the nature reserve, the dual carriageway bypass around the nature reserve was opened in 2017 as the first section of the motorway after three years of construction, plus five years of construction delay. The road through nature reserve was renamed FV-104.

FV-2 connects Morro Jable and Puerto del Rosario. Between La Lajita and Morro Jable, FV-2 is a dual carriageway highway. Car rental companies that have offices in the airports are: Autoreisen, Avis, Cicar, Europcar, Goldcar, Hertz, Sixt and TopCar.

Sport 
Many sports are commonly played in Fuerteventura, both in the open air and in sports centres across the island.

Native sports 
These are the Canarian sports found on the island:

Canarian wrestling 
The wrestling takes place in a ring of sand called the terrero. Inside it, the two contestants try to knock each other over. Fuerteventura has 14 terreros distributed through all the towns except Betancuria.

Antigua: Terrero de Antigua.
La Oliva: Terrero Venancio Guerra and Terrero de Villaverde.
Pájara: Terrero Miguel Díaz La Lajita, Terrero de Morro Jable a Terrero de Pájara.
Puerto del Rosario: Terrero de Casillas del Angel, Terrero Manuel Nieves, Terrero de Puerto Cabras, Terrero de Tefía a Terrero de Tetir.
Tuineje: Terrero de Gran Tarajal, Terrero de Tamasite, and Terrero Pedro Sánchez in Tarajalejo.

The island also has a school wrestling league organized by the council and a programme to promote this sport in clubs. Twelve wrestling schools participate in this, based in Antigua, Costa Calma, El Matorral, La Lajita, Lajares, Las Playitas, Morro Jable, Puerto del Rosario, Tefía, Tetir, Unión Sur and Villaverde.

Juego del Palo 

Juego del Palo is a Canarian martial art which literally translates as "game of the stick". It is played by two players both armed with sticks. They aim to defeat each other without making contact with their opponent's body. The origin of this game is unclear. All we know is that it is based on a method of combat used by the precolonial Canarian people.

Fuerteventura has the following Palo clubs:
Club-Escuela Dunas de Corralejo.
Club-Escuela Huriamen de Villaverde.
Club-Escuela Puerto Cabras.
Club-Escuela Sorinque de Gran Tarajal.

Canarian boules 
This is a similar game to the French Pétanque which is actually played very little on the island, although there are a few teams and courts. Basically the game consists of scoring points by throwing a ball to get it as near as possible to an object called a mingue or boliche.
Simple Petanque Rules -

Watersports 
The sea and climate conditions make the island the perfect place for a huge variety of watersports.

Surfing, windsurfing and kitesurfing 

Many types of surfing are popular on the island, including traditional surfing, windsurfing (where the board is propelled by a sail) and most recently kitesurfing. The island has many schools and courses dedicated to teaching these sports.

The sports where Fuerteventura has the most impact internationally are windsurfing and kitesurfing, mainly due to the International Windsurfing and Kiteboarding Championship. This has run since 1985 and is held at Playas de Sotavento in Pájara municipality. Many important wind and kitesurfing figures compete in this championship, such as the several-times world windsurfing champion Björn Dunkerbeck and Gisela Pulido, the very young kiteboarding champion from Tarifa.

Many Canarian windsurfers are on the Canarian Waveriders circuit, which has been based in Corralejo since 2005.

Diving 
Diving schools are just as frequent as surfing ones, all around the coast of Fuerteventura.

Two of the most useful points for diving are the coast off Playa del Matorral in the South, and the zone between Lobos Island and Corralejo in the north. It is here in Corralejo that the International Sea and Submarine Photography Festival takes places, known as Fimarsub Corralejo – Lobos. During the festival there are beginners' lessons, professional dives, lessons in underwater photography, screenings and other events related to the sport.

Swimming 
There are many swimming pools on the island but the most obvious place to swim is in the open sea. There is an annual swim from Lobos Island to Fuerteventura, held every year since 1999. The event attracts amateur swimmers from all over the Canaries and Spain, and also swimming professionals such as David Meca and Maarten van der Weijden, the paralympist Jesús Collado Alarcón who won gold medals for 100m backstroke and butterfly in Athens 2004, and Xavi Torres Ramis, the paralympic champion in Barcelona 1992, Sydney and Atlanta.

Sailing 

The island holds competitions involving different types of boat, such as the lateen and the Optimist. An interesting event is the Tour of Fuerteventura by Kayak, which is organised as a series of stages rather than a competition, and is an easy way to explore the island.

Fishing 
The most notable competition here is the Gran Tarajal Fishing Open.

Other sports 
Since 2004 the Marcha Ciclotourista has been held in La Oliva and the Criterium Ciclista has been held in Corralejo (also part of the La Oliva municipality) since 2005. Participants include , T-Mobile and a team from Orbea. These competitions have contributed to local interest in the sport and the first professional local team, the Fuerteventura–Canarias, was formed, initially run by Óscar Guerrero, director of Kaiku, although they have not competed for the past few seasons.

There are various motocross circuits on the island, including Los Alares in Antigua and Isla de Fuerteventura in Puerto del Rosario municipality. They hold regular trials, some of which form part of the Canarian Regional Motocross Championship. Throughout the year there are gravel rally races. Two are part of the Canarian Dirt Rally Championship. These are the Antiguan Rally and the La Oliva Rally.

The island's main football clubs are CD Union Puerto and CD Cotillo, who play in Group XII of the Spanish Tercera División RFEF.

The resort Playitas on the south coast is since around 2008 equipped with a  swimming pool and has become a destination for triathlon training camps for Europeans. An annual race called Challenge Fuerteventura is held there on the half ironman distance.

People 

Manuel Velázquez Cabrera: born in Tiscamanita in 1863, the politician and lawyer who created the island's council.
Juan Ismael: painter, cartoonist and poet born in La Oliva in 1907, considered one of the great Canarian surrealists.
Eustaquio Gopar: born in Tuineje in 1866. He was one of the Spanish soldiers involved in the Siege of Baler together with Major Rafael Alonso Mederos, who died of beri-beri during the siege. On his return Eustaquio became mayor over his native people. He held this post both during the republic and under Franco.

See also
List of volcanoes in Spain

References

External links
https://www.fuerteventura.com 
https://www.fuerteventura.com/history 

Fuerteventura Tourism Board

 
Islands of the Canary Islands
Fissure vents
Volcanoes of the Canary Islands
Miocene volcanoes
Pliocene volcanoes
Pleistocene volcanoes
Holocene volcanoes
Extinct volcanoes
Biosphere reserves of Spain
Protected areas of the Canary Islands